The 1899 ICA Track Cycling World Championships were the World Championship for track cycling. They took place in Montreal, Quebec, Canada from 9 to 11 August 1899. Four events for men were contested, two for professionals and two for amateurs.

Medal summary

Medal table

References

Track cycling
UCI Track Cycling World Championships by year
International cycle races hosted by Canada
Sports competitions in Montreal
ICA Track Cycling World Championships
ICA Track Cycling World Championships
ICA Track Cycling World Championships
19th century in Montreal